Skylink is an automated people mover (APM) operating at Dallas/Fort Worth International Airport (DFW). It is an application of the Innovia APM 200 system, and is maintained and operated by Alstom. When it opened in 2005, it was the world's longest airside airport train system (AirTrain JFK, which operates landside and opened in 2003, is longer).

History

Skylink was developed as a replacement for the Airtrans (part of which was later operated as American Airlines' TrAAin System), the airport's original people mover system that connected airport facilities and parking lots. The system was decommissioned soon after Skylink opened as a modern replacement and the old guideways were left in place throughout the airport.

Skylink guideway construction began in the fall of 1999 and took place with limited interruption of aircraft traffic. Contractors worked during overnight hours for 3 years – when airline gates were unused – arriving on site, completing work and removing equipment each morning before returning gates to an airline.

The system made its public debut on June 25, 2004, where it then began a rigorous testing period. It was opened to the public on May 21, 2005, and is completely automated.

Operations
The Skylink system is airside at DFW, serving passengers connecting between flights, and is inaccessible to those not arriving at DFW or who have not cleared security.  There is no need to leave security and be re-screened when switching terminals.  Arriving international passengers who are not pre-cleared (e.g. Canada) clear United States Customs and Border Protection formalities and are then security screened before access to the terminals. Departing international passengers connecting from domestic or pre-cleared international flights do not need to be re-screened.

The longest trip between farthest stations is 9 minutes with an average 5 minute journey. This allows most passengers to make a connection from any one flight to another in around seven minutes, not including walking time to and from the stations.

The Skylink system uses a total of 64 Innovia APM 200 vehicles, coupled together into two car trains. Each Skylink vehicle can accommodate up to 69 passengers and their carry-on luggage. The Innovia APM 200 technology is also used at London Heathrow Airport's Terminal 5 as well as the PHX Sky Train.

The audio announcements on SkyLink are provided by local voice-over artist Doc Morgan.

Structure
The inner track travels clockwise and the outer track travels counter-clockwise.

Each of the five terminals contains two stations which are accessed on the secure (air) side. Unlike the previous Airtrans APM system, Skylink only connects terminals and does not travel to the airport's parking lots or rental car facility. The stations contain four sets of doors on each platform for entrance and exiting of passengers. Two more stations can be constructed for a future Terminal F if it is built.

Gallery

References

External links 
 Official DFW International Airport site – SkyLink 
 Video of Skylink

Airport people mover systems in the United States
Dallas/Fort Worth International Airport
Innovia people movers
Public transportation in Texas
Railway lines opened in 2005